Geoffrey William Hughes DL (2 February 1944 – 27 July 2012) was an English actor. Hughes provided the voice of Paul McCartney in the animated film Yellow Submarine (1968), and rose to fame for portraying much-loved bin man Eddie Yeats in the long-running British soap opera Coronation Street from 1974 to 1983, making a return to the show in 1987. He is well known for playing loveable slob Onslow in the British sitcom Keeping Up Appearances (1990–1995); and 'Twiggy' in the sitcom The Royle Family, playing the part from 1998 to 2008.

From 2001 to 2005 he played Vernon Scripps, conman and loveable rogue, in the ITV police drama Heartbeat, taking over as the show's main loveable rogue from Bill Maynard's Claude Greengrass, and returning to the show briefly in 2007.

Hughes was diagnosed with prostate cancer in the 1990s and in 2010 he suffered a relapse which led him to retire from acting. He died from the illness, aged 68, in 2012.

Life and career
Hughes was born in Wallasey, Cheshire, to parents Ada (née Tulloch) and Bill. He had one younger brother, Gordon. He was brought up in Liverpool, where he attended Ranworth Square Primary School. He then went to Abbotsford Secondary Modern School in Norris Green, Liverpool. He started his career in repertory at the Victoria Theatre in Stoke-on-Trent. This was followed by his first West End production, the Lionel Bart and Alun Owen musical Maggie May. His other West End productions included the stage version of The Wonderful Wizard of Oz, Say Goodnight to Grandma, The Secret Life of Cartoons and several seasons of Run for your Wife. He later played Pistol in an open-air production of Henry V at Barnwell Manor. He also toured extensively in Britain and abroad.

Hughes' film credits included Smashing Time (1967), The Bofors Gun (1968), Till Death Us Do Part (1969), The Virgin Soldiers (1969), The Man Who Had Power Over Women (1970), Revenge (1971), Carry On at Your Convenience (1971), Adolf Hitler: My Part in His Downfall (1973), Tiffany Jones (1973), Confessions of a Driving Instructor (1976), Nijinsky (1980), and Flick (2008). He was also the voice of Paul McCartney in the Beatles' 1968 cartoon film Yellow Submarine.

In 1974, Hughes was cast as binman Eddie Yeats in the long-running soap opera Coronation Street. Over the next nine years he became, with Stan Ogden (as played by Bernard Youens), a foil to Stan's long-suffering wife Hilda (Jean Alexander). He left the series in 1983, making a brief return appearance in 1987 as part of Hilda's departure from the series.

Among his many other appearances on television are: An Arrow for Little Audrey; The Saint; Shadows of Fear; Z-Cars; Randall and Hopkirk (Deceased); Flying Lady; Making Out; Coasting; Doctor Who; Spender; and Boon. He played Trinculo in a version of The Tempest for the BBC and Squire Clodpoll in Good Friday 1663, one of Channel Four's new avant-garde operas. His comedy appearances on TV include The Likely Lads, Please Sir!, Dad's Army, Curry and Chips, No, Honestly and The Upper Hand.

Hughes played the character of Onslow in the BBC sitcom Keeping Up Appearances (1990–1995) which ran for 5 series and saw Hughes appear in all 44 episodes. In 1997 he and Judy Cornwell reprised their roles as Onslow and Daisy, in a special compilation programme called The Memoirs of Hyacinth Bucket which was subsequently released on VHS. Hughes reprised his role as Onslow one final time in 2008, for the video (DVD) release of a further compilation programme, Keeping Up Appearances: Life Lessons from Onslow.

He also had a recurring role as Twiggy in The Royle Family from 1998 until 2008.

Hughes usually appeared in pantomime over the Christmas period. He appeared on That Antony Cotton Show on 6 September 2007, in which he spoke about his role in a short film called Expresso, which also starred Sir Norman Wisdom. Hughes played the part of a man who visits a coffee shop for a "normal" coffee but is served by a pompous waiter. The film was sold in aid of Macmillan Cancer Support.

In 2007, he performed the Angel Gabriel in the BBC production Liverpool Nativity. From 2007, he also appeared in the first three series of the E4 drama Skins as a recurring character best known as Uncle Keith.

In 2009 he played Frank in Tim Firth's Absolutely Frank at the Oldham Coliseum Theatre and at the Harrogate Theatre.

Personal life, illness and death
Hughes married Susan Mundell in 1975.

His off-stage interests were sailing, football, golf, cricket, rock music, trees, and beer. He was also the Honorary Squire of the Dartington Morris Men and made an appearance at the Dartington Morris Ring meeting in September 2008. His musical interests included British folk rock and he compered at Fairport's Cropredy Convention annual music festival several times.

Hughes was a supporter of Everton Football Club.

Hughes received a diagnosis of prostate cancer in 1996.

In 2009 he was appointed Deputy Lieutenant of the Isle of Wight.

In 2010, he collapsed at home with extreme back pain. He was diagnosed with a relapse of prostate cancer, at which point he retired from acting.

He died from his illness on 27 July 2012, aged 68. Doctors stated that he died "peacefully in his sleep".

Filmography

References

External links

Geoffrey Hughes at the British Film Institute
Geoffrey Hughes (Aveleyman)

1944 births
2012 deaths
Deaths from cancer in England
English male voice actors
English male film actors
English male stage actors
People from Wallasey
Deaths from prostate cancer
English male soap opera actors
Male actors from Liverpool
Deputy Lieutenants of the Isle of Wight
Male actors from Merseyside
20th-century English male actors
21st-century English male actors